The 1920s (pronounced "nineteen-twenties" often shortened to the "20s" or the "Twenties") was a decade that began on January 1, 1920, and ended on December 31, 1929. In America, it is frequently referred to as the "Roaring Twenties" or the "Jazz Age", while in Europe the period is sometimes referred to as the "Golden Twenties" because of the economic boom following World War I (1914–1918). French speakers refer to the period as the "Années folles" ("Crazy Years"), emphasizing the era's social, artistic, and cultural dynamism.

The 1920s saw foreign oil companies begin operations in Venezuela, which became the world's second-largest oil-producing nation. The devastating Wall Street Crash in October 1929 is generally viewed as a harbinger of the end of 1920s prosperity in North America and Europe. In the Soviet Union, the New Economic Policy was created by the Bolsheviks in 1921, to be replaced by the first five-year plan in 1928. The 1920s saw the rise of radical political movements, with the Red Army triumphing against White movement forces in the Russian Civil War, and the emergence of far right political movements in Europe. In 1922, the fascist leader Benito Mussolini seized power in Italy. Other dictators that emerged included Józef Piłsudski in Poland, and Peter and Alexander Karađorđević in Yugoslavia. First-wave feminism made advances, with women gaining the right to vote in the United States (1920), Albania (1920), Ireland (1921), and with suffrage being expanded in Britain to all women over 21 years old (1928).

In Turkey, nationalist forces defeated Greece, France, Armenia and Britain in the Turkish War of Independence, leading to the Treaty of Lausanne (July 1923), a treaty more favorable to Turkey than the earlier proposed Treaty of Sèvres. The war also led to the abolition of the Ottoman Caliphate. Nationalist revolts also occurred in Ireland (1919–1921) and Syria (1925–1927). Under Mussolini, Italy pursued a more aggressive domestic and foreign policy, leading to the nigh-eradication of the Sicilian Mafia and the Second Italo-Senussi War in Libya respectively. In 1927, China erupted into a civil war between the Kuomintang (KMT)-led government of the Republic of China (ROC) and forces of the Chinese Communist Party (CCP). Civil wars also occurred in Paraguay (1922–1923), Ireland (1922–1923), Honduras (1924), Nicaragua (1926–1927), and Afghanistan (1928–1929). Saudi forces conquered Jabal Shammar and subsequently, Hejaz.

A severe famine occurred in Russia in 1921–1922 due to the combined effects of economic disturbance because of the Russian Revolution and the Russian Civil War, exacerbated by rail systems that could not distribute food efficiently, leading to 5 million deaths. Another severe famine occurred in China in 1928–1930, leading to 6 million deaths. The Spanish flu (1918–1920) and the 1918–1922 Russia typhus epidemic, which had begun in the previous decade, caused 25–50 million and 2–3 million deaths respectively. Major natural disasters of this decade include the 1920 Haiyuan earthquake (258,707~273,407 deaths), the 1922 Shantou typhoon (50,000–100,000 deaths), the 1923 Great Kantō earthquake (105,385–142,800 deaths), and the 1927 Gulang earthquake (40,912 deaths).

Silent films were popular in this decade, with the 1925 American silent epic adventure-drama film Ben-Hur: A Tale of the Christ being the highest-grossing film of this decade, grossing $9,386,000 worldwide. Other high-grossing films included The Big Parade and The Singing Fool. Sinclair Lewis was a popular author in the United States in the 1920s,  with his books Main Street and Elmer Gantry becoming best-sellers. Best-selling books outside the US included the Czech book The Good Soldier Švejk, which sold 20 million copies.  Songs of this decade included "Are You Lonesome Tonight?" and "Stardust".

During the 1920s, the world population increased from 1.87 to 2.05 billion, with approximately 700 million births and 525 million deaths in total.

Social history 

The Roaring Twenties brought about several novel and highly visible social and cultural trends. These trends, made possible by sustained economic prosperity, were most visible in major cities like New York, Chicago, Paris, Berlin and London. "Normalcy" returned to politics in the wake of hyper-emotional patriotism during World War I, jazz blossomed, and Art Deco peaked. For women, knee-length skirts and dresses became socially acceptable, as did bobbed hair with a finger wave or marcel wave. The women who pioneered these trends were frequently referred to as flappers.

The era saw the large-scale adoption of automobiles, telephones, motion pictures, radio and household electricity, as well as unprecedented industrial growth, accelerated consumer demand and aspirations, and significant changes in lifestyle and culture. The media began to focus on celebrities, especially sports heroes and movie stars. Large baseball stadiums were built in major U.S. cities, in addition to palatial cinemas.

Most independent countries passed women's suffrage after 1918, especially as a reward for women's support of the war effort and endurance of its deaths and hardships.

Politics and wars

Wars 

 Turkish War of Independence
 Greco-Turkish War (May 1919 – October 1922)
 Turkish–Armenian War (September–December 1920)
 Franco-Turkish War (December 1918 – October 1921)
 Royalist and separatist revolts (1919–1923)
 Unification of Saudi Arabia
 Rashidi–Saudi War (1903–1921)
 Kuwait–Saudi War (1919–1920)
 Hejaz–Saudi War (1919–1925)
 Transjordan-Saudi War (1922–1924)
 Polish–Soviet War (February 1919 – March 1922)
 Irish War of Independence (January 1919 – July 1921)
 Iraqi Revolt (1920)
 Rif War (1920–1927)
 Second Italo-Senussi War (1923–1932)
 Great Syrian Revolt (1925–1927)
 United States occupation of Nicaragua (1912–1933)
 United States occupation of Haiti (1915–1934)
 United States occupation of the Dominican Republic (1916–1924)

Internal conflicts 
 Russian Civil War (November 1917 – October 1922)
 Tambov Rebellion (August 1920 – June 1921)
 Allied intervention in the Russian Civil War (1918 – 1925)
 Patagonia Rebelde (1920–1922)
 Mahmud Barzanji revolts (1920–1922)
 Irish Civil War (June 28, 1922 – May 24, 1923)
 Chinese Civil War (first phase 1927–1936)
 Ararat rebellion (1927–1930)
 Kongo-Wara rebellion (1928–1931)
 Afghan Civil War (November 14, 1928 – October 13, 1929)

Major political changes 

 Rise of radical political movements such as communism led by the Soviet Union and fascism led by Italy.
 League of Nations and associated bodies as experiment in international cooperation and prevention of wars

Decolonization and independence 
 Irish Free State gains independence from the United Kingdom in 1922.
 Egypt officially becomes an independent country through the Declaration of 1922, though it still remains under the military and political influence of the British Empire.

Prominent political events

Peace and disarmament
 Washington Naval Conference of 1922
 followup treaties for the Limitation of Naval Armament
 Geneva Protocol 1925, outlaws poison gas
 Geneva Naval Conference 1927
 Kellogg–Briand Pact (1928) signed by most nations promising not to declare war.
 London Naval Treaty, 1930
 Conference for the Reduction and Limitation of Armaments 1932-1934

Women's suffrage

 Women's suffrage movement continues to make gains as women obtain full voting rights in the United Kingdom in 1918 (women over 30) and in 1928 (full enfranchisement), in the United States in 1920. Also : full or partial gains in Uruguay 1917; Canada, 1917–1925 except Quebec (1940); Czechoslovakia 1920; Irish Free State, 1922; Burma, 1922; Italy, 1925 (partial); Ecuador 1929.

United States 

 Prohibition of alcohol occurs in the United States. Prohibition in the United States began January 16, 1919, with the ratification of the Eighteenth Amendment to the U.S.Constitution, effective as of January 17, 1920, and it continued throughout the 1920s. Prohibition was finally repealed in 1933. Organized crime turns to smuggling and bootlegging of liquor, led by figures such as Al Capone, boss of the Chicago Outfit.
 The Immigration Act of 1924 places restrictions on immigration. National quotas curbed most Eastern and Southern European nationalities, further enforced the ban on immigration of East Asians, Indians and Africans, and put mild regulations on nationalities from the Western Hemisphere (Latin Americans).
 The major sport was baseball and the most famous player was Babe Ruth.
 The Lost Generation (which characterized disillusionment), was the name Gertrude Stein gave to American writers, poets, and artists living in Europe during the 1920s. Famous members of the Lost Generation include Cole Porter, Gerald Murphy, Patrick Henry Bruce, Waldo Peirce, Ernest Hemingway, F. Scott Fitzgerald, Zelda Fitzgerald, Ezra Pound, John Dos Passos, and Sherwood Anderson.
 A peak in the early 1920s in the membership of the Ku Klux Klan of four to five million members (after its reemergence in 1915), followed by a rapid decline down to an estimated 30,000 members by 1930.
 The Scopes Trial (1925), which declared that John T. Scopes had violated the law by teaching evolution in schools, creating tension between the competing theories of creationism and evolutionism.

Europe 

 Polish–Soviet War (1920–21); Poland defeats Soviet expansion; Ukraine and Belarus were divided.
 Major armed conflict in Ireland including Irish War of Independence (1919–1921) resulting in Ireland becoming an independent country in 1922 followed by the Irish Civil War (1922–23).
 Russian famine of 1921–22 claimed up to five million victims.
 The Union of Soviet Socialist Republics (Soviet Union) is created in 1922.
 Benito Mussolini leader of the National Fascist Party became Prime Minister of Italy, shortly thereafter creating the world's first fascist government. The Fascist regime establishes a totalitarian state led by Mussolini as a dictator. The Fascist regime restores good relations between the Roman Catholic Church and Italy with the Lateran Treaty, which creates Vatican City. The Fascist regime pursues an aggressive expansionist agenda in Europe such as by raiding the Greek island of Corfu in 1923, pressuring Albania to submit to becoming a de facto Italian protectorate in the mid-1920s, and holding territorial aims on the region of Dalmatia in Yugoslavia.
 In Germany, the Weimar Republic suffers from economic crisis in the early 1920s and hyperinflation of currency in 1923. From 1923 to 1925 the Occupation of the Ruhr takes place. The Ruhr was an industrial region of Germany taken over by the military forces of the French Third Republic and Belgium, in response to the failure of the Weimar Republic under Chancellor Wilhelm Cuno to keep paying the World War I reparations. The recently formed fringe National Socialist German Workers' Party (a.k.a. Nazi Party) led by Adolf Hitler attempts a coup against the Bavarian and German governments in the 1923 Beer Hall Putsch, which fails, resulting in Hitler being briefly imprisoned for one year in prison where he writes Mein Kampf.
 Turkish War of Independence (1919–23).
 United Kingdom general strike (1926).

Asia 
 The Qajar dynasty ended under Ahmad Shah Qajar as Reza Shah Pahlavi founds the Pahlavi Dynasty, which later became the last monarchy of Iran.
 The Northern Expedition (1926-1928)
 The Chinese Civil War begins (1927–1937).
 In the Kingdom of Afghanistan, Amanullah Khan's reforms cause conflict with conservative factions, resulting in the Afghan Civil War.

Africa 
 Pan-Africanist supporters of Marcus Garvey's Universal Negro Improvement Association and African Communities League (UNIA-ACL) are repressed by colonial powers in Africa. Garvey's UNIA-ACL supported the creation of a state led by black people in Africa including African Americans.

Economics 

 Economic boom ended by "Black Tuesday" (October 29, 1929); the stock market crashes, leading to the Great Depression. The market actually began to drop on Thursday October 24, 1929, and the fall continued until the huge crash on Tuesday October 29, 1929.
 The New Economic Policy is created by the Bolsheviks in the Russian Soviet Federative Socialist Republic, to be replaced by the first five-year plan in 1928.
 The Dawes Plan, by which U.S. funded German reparations from 1924 to 1928.
 Average annual inflation for the decade was virtually zero but individual years ranged from a high of 3.47% in 1925 to a deflationary −11% in 1921.

Natural disasters 
 The Great Kantō earthquake struck the main Japanese island of Honshū on 1 September, 1923. The earthquake had a magnitude of 7.9 on the moment magnitude scale.

Assassinations and attempts
Prominent assassinations, targeted killings, and assassination attempts include:
 Walther Rathenau, Foreign Minister of Germany is assassinated by Ernst Werner Techow, Erwin Kern, and Hermann Willibald Fischer, all members of Organisation Consul on June 24, 1922.
 Francisco "Pancho" Villa, a Mexican Revolutionary general is assassinated by a group of seven assassins on July 20, 1923.

Science and technology

Technology 
 John Logie Baird invents the first working mechanical television system (1925). In 1928, he invents and demonstrates the first color television.
 Warner Brothers produces the first movie with a soundtrack Don Juan in 1926, followed by the first Part-Talkie The Jazz Singer in 1927, the first All-Talking movie Lights of New York in 1928 and the first All-Color All-Talking movie On with the Show, 1929. Silent films start giving way to sound films. By 1936, the transition phase arguably ends, with Modern Times being the last notable silent film.
 Karl Ferdinand Braun invents the modern electronic cathode ray tube in 1897. The CRT became a commercial product in 1922.
 Record companies (such as Victor, Brunswick and Columbia) introduce an electrical recording process on their phonograph records in 1925 (that had been developed by Western Electric), resulting in a more lifelike sound.
 The first electric razor is patented in 1928 by the American manufacturer Col. Jacob Schick.
 The first selective Jukeboxes being introduced in 1927 by the Automated Musical Instrument Company.
 Harold Stephen Black revolutionizes the field of applied electronics by inventing the negative feedback amplifier in 1927.
 Clarence Birdseye invents a process for frozen food in 1925.
 Robert Goddard makes the first flight of a liquid-fueled rocket in 1926.

Science 
 Charles Lindbergh becomes the first person to fly solo across the Atlantic Ocean (May 20–21, 1927), nonstop from New York to Paris.
 Howard Carter opens the innermost shrine of King Tutankhamun's tomb near Luxor, Egypt, 1922
 In 1928, Alexander Fleming discovers penicillin

Popular culture

Film 

 Oscar winners: Wings (1927–1928), The Broadway Melody (1928–1929), All Quiet on the Western Front (1929–1930)
 First feature-length motion picture with a soundtrack (Don Juan) is released in 1926. First part-talkie (The Jazz Singer) released in 1927, first all-talking feature (Lights of New York) released in 1928 and first all-color all-talking feature (On with the Show) released in 1929.
 The first animated short film by Walt Disney is released in 1928, featuring Mickey Mouse. Steamboat Willie was the first sound cartoon to attract widespread notice and popularity.

Fashion 

The 1920s is the decade in which fashion entered the modern era. It was the decade in which women first abandoned the more restricting fashions of past years and began to wear more comfortable clothes (such as short skirts or trousers). Men also abandoned highly formal daily attire and even began to wear athletic clothing for the first time. The suits men wear today are still based, for the most part, on those worn in the late 1920s. The 1920s are characterized by two distinct periods of fashion. In the early part of the decade, change was slow, as many were reluctant to adopt new styles. From 1925, the public passionately embraced the styles associated with the Roaring Twenties. These styles continued to characterize fashion until the worldwide depression worsened in 1931.

Music 

 "The Jazz Age"—jazz and jazz-influenced dance music became widely popular throughout the decade.
 George Gershwin wrote Rhapsody in Blue and An American in Paris.
 Eddie Lang and Joe Venuti were the first musicians to incorporate the guitar and violin into jazz.

Radio 

 First commercial radio stations in the U.S., 8MK (WWJ) in Detroit and (KDKA 1020 AM) in Pittsburgh, Pennsylvania, go on the air on August 27, 1920.
 Both stations broadcast the election results between Harding and Cox in early November. The first station to receive a commercial license is WBZ, then in Springfield MA, in mid-September 1921. While there are only a few radio stations in 1920–21, by 1922 the radio craze is sweeping the country.
 1922: The BBC begins radio broadcasting in the United Kingdom as the British Broadcasting Company, a consortium between radio manufacturers and newspapers. It became a public broadcaster in 1926.
 On August 27, 1920, regular wireless broadcasts for entertainment began in Argentina for the first time, by a Buenos Aires group including Enrique Telémaco Susini. The station is soon called Radio Argentina. (See Radio in Argentina.)

Arts 
 Beginning of surrealist movement.
 Art Deco becomes fashionable.
 The Group of Seven (artists).
 Pablo Picasso paints Three Musicians in 1921.
 René Magritte paints The Treachery of Images.
 Albert Gleizes paints Woman with Black Glove, 1920
 Marcel Duchamp completes The Bride Stripped Bare By Her Bachelors, Even (The Large Glass).
 The Museum of Modern Art opens in Manhattan, November 7, 1929, nine days after the Wall Street Crash.
 The first science fiction comic strip, Buck Rogers, begins January 7, 1929. The first Tarzan comic strip begins on the same date.

Literature 

The best-selling books of every year in the United States were as follows:
 1920: The Man of the Forest by Zane Grey
 1921: Main Street by Sinclair Lewis
 1922: If Winter Comes by A. S. M. Hutchinson
 1923: Black Oxen by Gertrude Atherton
 1924: So Big by Edna Ferber
 1925: Soundings by A. Hamilton Gibbs
 1926: The Private Life of Helen of Troy by John Erskine
 1927: Elmer Gantry by Sinclair Lewis
 1928: The Bridge of San Luis Rey by Thornton Wilder
 1929: All Quiet on the Western Front by Erich Maria Remarque

Architecture 

 Walter Gropius builds the Bauhaus in Dessau
 Le Corbusier published the book Toward an Architecture serving as the manifesto for a generation of architects.

Sports highlights

1920
 January 24: Grand Prix de Paris switches its name to Prix de l'Arc de Triomphe (horse race)
 February 13: Negro National League created (baseball)
 April: Babe Ruth began playing for the New York Yankees
 April–September: Summer Olympics held in Antwerp.
 August 17: Ray Chapman from the Cleveland Indians is killed by Carl Mays' pitch (baseball)
 August 20: National Football League founded
 Kenesaw Mountain Landis is named the first Commissioner of Baseball.

1921
 March 26: Schooner Bluenose launched

1923
 May 26: the 24 hours of Le Mans conducts their first sports car race
 October: The New York Yankees win the 1923 World Series, the first title for the team.

1924
 January–February: First Winter Olympic Games takes place in Chamonix France.
 May–July: Summer Olympics held in Paris, France.
 July 10–13: Paavo Nurmi wins five gold medals in Summer Olympics (track and field)

1925
 May 28: French Open invites non-French tennis athletes for the first time
 Germany and Belgium in first handball international tournament.

1926
 August 6: Gertrude Ederle swims English Channel and is first woman to do so.
 September 23: Gene Tunney wins Jack Dempsey's world heavyweight boxing title.

1927
 May 23: Warwickshire end Yorkshire's 71-match unbeaten sequence in the County Championship – the longest unbeaten sequence in that competition.
 June 3: First Ryder Cup golf tournaments are held in Massachusetts

1928
 February: Winter Olympics held in St. Moritz Switzerland.
 May–August: Women's Olympics takes place for first time, in 1928 Summer Olympics held in Amsterdam.
 William Ralph "Dixie" Dean wins the Football League, scores 60 goals in 39 matches for Everton F.C. (English Football)

1929
 The English team led by Wally Hammond defeats Australia in The Ashes series (Test Cricket)

Miscellaneous trends 
 Youth culture of The Lost Generation; flappers, the Charleston, and the bob cut haircut.
 Fads such as marathon dancing, mah-jong, crossword puzzles and pole-sitting are popular.
 The height of the clip joint.
 The Harlem Renaissance centered in a thriving African American community of Harlem, New York City.
 Since the 1920s scholars have methodically dug into the layers of history that lie buried at thousands of sites across China.
 The tomb of Tutankhamun is discovered intact by Howard Carter (1922). This begins a second revival of Egyptomania.
 Twiglets are invented in December 1929 by Frenchman Rondalin Zwadoodie, and sold by Peek Freans.
 Smoking in America was deemed socially acceptable, with the first magazine advertising women smoking for the first time in 1927.
 Newly improved latex condoms resulted in soaring condom sales in the United States.

People

Science 

 Albert Einstein
 Sigmund Freud
 Alexander Fleming
 Frederick Banting
 Niels Bohr
 Werner Heisenberg
 Howard Carter
 Georges Lemaître
 Edwin Powell Hubble
 Garrett Morgan

Literature 

 Alexander Belyaev
 Bertolt Brecht
 Countee Cullen
 Nancy Cunard
 T. S. Eliot
 William Faulkner
 F. Scott Fitzgerald
 Zelda Fitzgerald
 Ernest Hemingway
 Langston Hughes
 Zora Neale Hurston
 James Weldon Johnson
 Erich Kastner
 Sinclair Lewis
 Alain Locke
 Thomas Mann
 Claude McKay
 Carl Sandburg
 William Butler Yeats

Entertainers 

 Charlie Chaplin
 Buster Keaton
 Roscoe "Fatty" Arbuckle
 Mary Astor
 Josephine Baker
 Tallulah Bankhead
 Ethel Barrymore
 John Barrymore
 Lionel Barrymore
 Clara Bow
 Louise Brooks
 Lon Chaney
 Katharine Cornell
 Joan Crawford
 Bebe Daniels
 Betty Bronson
 Mary Brian
 Marion Davies
 Douglas Fairbanks
 Eva Le Gallienne
 Greta Garbo
 Janet Gaynor
 John Gilbert
 Dorothy Gish
 Lillian Gish
 William Haines
 William S. Hart
 Harry Houdini
 Emil Jannings
 Al Jolson
 Harold Lloyd
 Tom Mix
 Colleen Moore
 Mae Murray
 Pola Negri
 Ramón Novarro
 Will Rogers
 Mary Pickford
 Norma Shearer
 Gloria Swanson
 Chief Tahachee
 Norma Talmadge
 Rudolph Valentino
 Anna May Wong

Musicians 

 George Gershwin
 Al Jolson
 Louis Armstrong
 Richard Tauber
 Irving Berlin
 Eddie Cantor
 Duke Ellington
 Kelly Harrell
 Jimmy Rodgers
 Jelly Roll Morton
 Cole Porter
 Rudy Vallée
 Paul Whiteman
 Fats Waller
 Fletcher Henderson
 Eddie Lang
 Joe Venuti
 Bix Beiderbecke
 Art Tatum
 Béla Bartók
 Lonnie Johnson
 Bessie Smith
 Count Basie
 King Oliver
 Sidney Bechet
 Blind Willie Johnson

Film makers 

 Harry Beaumont
 Busby Berkeley
 Frank Borzage
 Charles Chaplin
 Alan Crosland
 Cecil B. DeMille
 William C. DeMille
 Sergei Eisenstein
 Victor Fleming
 John Ford
 D. W. Griffith
 Alfred Hitchcock
 Rex Ingram
 Buster Keaton
 Fritz Lang
 Ernst Lubitsch
 Lewis Milestone
 Erich von Stroheim
 King Vidor
 Robert Wiene

Artists 

 Hans Arp
 Max Beckmann
 Georges Braque
 André Breton
 Patrick Henry Bruce
 Alexander Calder
 Carlo Carrà
 Marc Chagall
 Giorgio de Chirico
 Salvador Dalí
 Stuart Davis
 Charles Demuth
 Otto Dix
 Theo van Doesburg
 Arthur Dove
 Marcel Duchamp
 Max Ernst
 Alberto Giacometti
 Julio Gonzalez
 Juan Gris
 George Grosz
 Marsden Hartley
 Wassily Kandinsky
 Paul Klee
 Gaston Lachaise
 Fernand Léger
 Tamara de Lempicka
 René Magritte
 Georges Malkine
 John Marin
 André Masson
 Henri Matisse
 Joan Miró
 Piet Mondrian
 Henry Moore
 Max Morise
 Georgia O'Keeffe
 Francis Picabia
 Pablo Picasso
 Man Ray
 Morgan Russell
 Kurt Schwitters
 Charles Sheeler
 Chaïm Soutine
 Yves Tanguy
 Stanton Macdonald-Wright

Architects 

 Marcel Breuer
 Le Corbusier
 Walter Gropius
 Ludwig Mies van der Rohe
 Frank Lloyd Wright

Sports figures 

 Grover Cleveland Alexander (American baseball player)
 Ty Cobb, (American baseball player)
 Eddie Collins, (American baseball player)
 Walter Johnson (American baseball player)
 Rogers Hornsby (American baseball player)
 Babe Ruth (American baseball player)
 Tris Speaker, (American baseball player)
 Lou Gehrig (American baseball player)
 Kenesaw Mountain Landis (American Baseball Commissioner)
 Gene Tunney (American boxer)
 Jack Dempsey (American boxer)
 Francisco Guilledo (Filipino boxer)
 Warwick Armstrong (Australian cricket captain)
 Wilfred Rhodes (Yorkshire and England cricketer)
 Jack Hobbs (Surrey and England cricketer)
 Herbert Sutcliffe (Yorkshire and England cricketer)
 Maurice Tate (Sussex and England cricketer)
 Jack Gregory, Australian cricketer
 Bert Oldfield, Australian cricketer
 Herbie Taylor, South African cricketer
 Alex Grove (American bowler)
 Red Grange (American football player)
 Knute Rockne (American football player and coach)
 Alex James (Arsenal and Scotland soccer player)
 Gordon Coventry (Australian rules football player)
 Walter Hagen (American golfer)
 Bobby Jones (American golfer)
 Paavo Nurmi (Finnish runner)
 Fanny "Bobbie" Rosenfeld (Canadian athlete)
 Earl Sande (jockey)
 Gertrude Ederle (swimming)
 Johnny Weissmuller (swimming)
 Suzanne Lenglen (French tennis player)
 Helen Wills Moody (American tennis player)
 Bill Tilden (American tennis player)

See also 

 Interwar Britain
 1920s in television
 Table of years in radio
 1920s in literature
 Roaring Twenties

Timeline 
The following articles contain brief timelines listing the most prominent events of the decade:

1920 • 1921 • 1922 • 1923 • 1924 • 1925 • 1926 • 1927 • 1928 • 1929

Notes

References

Sources

Further reading 
 Allen, Frederick Lewis. Only Yesterday: An Informal History of the 1920s (1931), classic popular history of United States; online free
 Cornelissen, Christoph, and Arndt Weinrich, eds. Writing the Great War - The Historiography of World War I from 1918 to the Present (2020) free download; full coverage for major countries.
 Currell, Susan. American Culture in the 1920s (Edinburgh University Press, 2009), a British perspective.
 Dumenil, Lynn. The modern temper: American culture and society in the 1920s (Macmillan, 1995).
 Grossman, Mark. Encyclopedia of the Interwar Years: From 1919 to 1939 (2000). 400pp.
 Jacobson, Jon. "Is there a New International History of the 1920s?." American Historical Review 88.3 (1983): 617–645. online
 Johnson, GAynor, and Michael Dockrill eds. Locarno Revisited: European Diplomacy 1920-1929 (2004)
 McAuliffe, Mary. When Paris Sizzled: The 1920s Paris of Hemingway, Chanel, Cocteau, Cole Porter, Josephine Baker, and Their Friends (2016) excerpt
 Maier, Charles S. Recasting bourgeois Europe: stabilization in France, Germany, and Italy in the decade after World War I (Princeton University Press, 2015).
 Mowat, Charles Loch. Britain Between the Wars, 1918–1940 (1955), 690pp; thorough scholarly coverage; emphasis on politics also online free to read, scholarly survey of the era.
 Sobel, Robert The Great Bull Market: Wall Street in the 1920s. (1968)
 Uldricks, Teddy J. "Russia and Europe: Diplomacy, Revolution, and Economic Development in the 1920s." International History Review 1.1 (1979): 55–83.
 Walters, Ryan S. The Jazz Age President: Defending Warren G. Harding (2022) excerpt also online review

 
Roaring Twenties
1920s decade overviews